North East London may refer to:

 North East London, a sub-region used in the London Plan 2008–2011
North East (London Assembly constituency)

See also

London